Social network analysis software (SNA software) is software which facilitates quantitative or qualitative analysis of social networks, by describing features of a network either through numerical or visual representation.

Overview
Networks can consist of anything from families, project teams, classrooms, sports teams, legislatures, nation-states, disease vectors, membership on networking websites like Twitter or Facebook, or even the Internet.  Networks can consist of direct linkages between nodes or indirect linkages based upon shared attributes, shared attendance at events, or common affiliations. Network features can be at the level of individual nodes, dyads, triads, ties and/or edges, or the entire network.  For example, node-level features can include network phenomena such as betweenness and centrality, or individual attributes such as age, sex, or income. SNA software generates these features from raw network data formatted in an edgelist, adjacency list, or adjacency matrix (also called sociomatrix), often combined with (individual/node-level) attribute data. Though the majority of network analysis software uses a plain text ASCII data format, some software packages contain the capability to utilize relational databases to import and/or store network features.

Features 
Visual representations of social networks are important to understand network data and convey the result of the analysis. Visualization often also facilitates qualitative interpretation of network data.   With respect to visualization, network analysis tools are used to change the layout, colors, size and other properties of the network representation.

Some SNA software can perform predictive analysis. This includes using network phenomena such as a tie to predict individual level outcomes (often called peer influence or contagion modeling), using individual-level phenomena to predict network outcomes such as the formation of a tie/edge (often called homophily models) or particular type of triad, or using network phenomena to predict other network phenomena, such as using a triad formation at time 0 to predict tie formation at time 1.

Collection of social network analysis tools and libraries

See also
 Comparison of research networking tools and research profiling systems
 Social network
 Social network analysis
 Social networking
 Organizational Network Analysis

References

Notes

Barnes, J. A. "Class and Committees in a Norwegian Island Parish", Human Relations 7:39-58
Borgatti, S. (2002). NetDraw Software for Network Visualization. Lexington, KY: Analytic Technologies.
Borgatti, S. E. (2002). Ucinet for Windows: Software for Social Network Analysis. Harvard, MA: Analytic Technologies.
Berkowitz, S. D. 1982. An Introduction to Structural Analysis: The Network Approach to Social Research. Toronto: Butterworth.
Brandes, Ulrik, and Thomas Erlebach (Eds.). 2005. Network Analysis: Methodological Foundations Berlin, Heidelberg: Springer-Verlag.
Breiger, Ronald L. 2004. "The Analysis of Social Networks."  Pp. 505–526 in Handbook of Data Analysis, edited by Melissa Hardy and Alan Bryman. London: Sage Publications.  Excerpts in pdf format
Burt, Ronald S. (1992). Structural Holes: The Structure of Competition. Cambridge, MA: Harvard University Press.
Carrington, Peter J., John Scott and Stanley Wasserman (Eds.). 2005. Models and Methods in Social Network Analysis. New York: Cambridge University Press.
Christakis, Nicholas and James H. Fowler "The Spread of Obesity in a Large Social Network Over 32 Years," New England Journal of Medicine 357 (4): 370-379 (26 July 2007)
Doreian, Patrick, Vladimir Batagelj, and Anuska Ferligoj. (2005). Generalized Blockmodeling. Cambridge: Cambridge University Press.
Freeman, Linton C. (2004) The Development of Social Network Analysis: A Study in the Sociology of Science. Vancouver: Empirical Press.
Hansen, William B. and Reese, Eric L. 2009. Network Genie Users Manual. Greensboro, NC: Tanglewood Research.
Hill, R. and Dunbar, R. 2002. "Social Network Size in Humans."  Human Nature, Vol. 14, No. 1, pp. 53–72.Google
 pdf
Huisman, M. and Van Duijn, M. A. J. (2005). Software for Social Network Analysis. In P J. Carrington, J. Scott, & S. Wasserman (Editors), Models and Methods in Social Network Analysis (pp. 270–316). New York: Cambridge University Press.
Krebs, Valdis (2002) Uncloaking Terrorist Networks, First Monday, volume 7, number 4 (Application of SNA software to terror nets Web Reference.)
Krebs, Valdis (2008) A Brief Introduction to Social Network Analysis (Common metrics in most SNA software Web Reference.)
Krebs, Valdis (2008) Various Case Studies & Projects using Social Network Analysis software Web Reference.
Lin, Nan, Ronald S. Burt and Karen Cook, eds. (2001). Social Capital: Theory and Research. New York: Aldine de Gruyter.
Mullins, Nicholas. 1973. Theories and Theory Groups in Contemporary American Sociology. New York: Harper and Row.
Müller-Prothmann, Tobias (2006): Leveraging Knowledge Communication for Innovation. Framework, Methods and Applications of Social Network Analysis in Research and Development, Frankfurt a. M. et al.: Peter Lang, .
    via JSTOR
Moody, James, and Douglas R. White (2003). "Structural Cohesion and Embeddedness: A Hierarchical Concept of Social Groups." American Sociological Review 68(1):103-127. 

Nohria, Nitin and Robert Eccles (1992). Networks in Organizations. second ed. Boston: Harvard Business Press.
Nooy, Wouter d., A. Mrvar and Vladimir Batagelj. (2005). Exploratory Social Network Analysis with Pajek. Cambridge: Cambridge University Press.
Scott, John. (2000). Social Network Analysis: A Handbook. 2nd Ed. Newberry Park, CA: Sage.
Tilly, Charles. (2005). Identities, Boundaries, and Social Ties. Boulder, CO: Paradigm press.
Valente, Thomas. (1995). Network Models of the Diffusion of Innovation. Cresskill, NJ: Hampton Press.
Wasserman, Stanley, & Faust, Katherine. (1994). Social Networks Analysis: Methods and Applications. Cambridge: Cambridge University Press.
Watkins, Susan Cott. (2003). "Social Networks." Pp. 909–910 in Encyclopedia of Population. rev. ed. Edited by Paul Demeny and Geoffrey McNicoll. New York: Macmillan Reference.
 
Watts, Duncan. (2004). Six Degrees: The Science of a Connected Age. W. W. Norton & Company.
Wellman, Barry (1999). Networks in the Global Village. Boulder, CO: Westview Press.

Wellman, Barry and Berkowitz, S.D. (1988). Social Structures: A Network Approach. Cambridge: Cambridge University Press.
{{cite document|author=Weng, M.|year=2007|title=A Multimedia Social-Networking Community for Mobile Devices Interactive Telecommunications Program|publisher=Tisch School of the Arts/ New York University|citeseerx=10.1.1.538.7640}}
White, Harrison, Scott Boorman and Ronald Breiger. 1976. "Social Structure from Multiple Networks: I Blockmodels of Roles and Positions." American Journal of Sociology 81: 730–80.

External links
International Network for Social Network Analysis (INSNA) list of software packages and libraries: Computer Programs for Social Network Analysis page.
 2010 : A comparative study of social network analysis tools by Combe, Largeron, Egyed-Zsigmond and Géry: 

 
Social networks
Comparisons of mathematical software
Data analysis software
Social network analysis